"Zock On!" is a single by Japanese hip hop group Teriyaki Boyz, released as the second single from their second studio album Serious Japanese. It was produced by The Neptunes and features Busta Rhymes and Pharrell. According to Verbal in an interview with DJ Semtex, the beat co-produced by Pharrell was initiated solely using buckets.

The song reached #16 on the Japan Oricon Singles Chart for the week of March 20, 2008.

Track listing
"Zock On!" – 4:03
"I Still Love H.E.R." (Low Jack Three Remix) – 5:11
"Zock On!" (Instrumental)	– 4:02
"I Still Love H.E.R." (Low Jack Three Remix) [Instrumental] – 5:13

Charts

External links

References

2007 songs
2008 singles
Pharrell Williams songs
Busta Rhymes songs
Song recordings produced by the Neptunes
Songs written by Verbal (rapper)
Star Trak Entertainment singles